Kyaw Thein (born 11 March 1954) is a Burmese politician who currently serves as an Amyotha Hluttaw MP for Rakhine State  No. 7 Constituency. He is a member of Union Solidarity and Development Party.

Early life and education
He was born on 11 March 1954 in Maungdaw, Rakhine State, Burma(Myanmar). He graduated with B.A(L.L.B) from Sittwe University.

Political career
He is a member of the Union Solidarity and Development Party. In the Myanmar general election, 2015, he was elected as an Amyotha Hluttaw MP and elected representative from Rakhine State No. 7 parliamentary constituency .

References

Union Solidarity and Development Party politicians
1954 births
Living people
People from Rakhine State